Sturla Ottesen (born 25 May 2001) is a Norwegian football defender who plays for Stabæk.

He started his youth career in Kjelsås, but also tried his luck at Lyn. In 2019 he started his senior career at Kjelsås in the 2. divisjon and also made his debut for a Norwegian youth national team. At the end of the season he was selected by the Football Association of Norway as 2. divisjon's "talent of the year". Right before the closing of the second summer transfer window in 2020, as late as October, he was bought by first-tier Stabæk. He made his debut later that month as a starter against Aalesund.

References

2001 births
Living people
Footballers from Oslo
Norwegian footballers
Kjelsås Fotball players
Stabæk Fotball players
Eliteserien players
Association football defenders
Norway youth international footballers